Kabarak University is one of Kenya's Top private chartered institution of higher learning that provides holistic Christian-based quality education, training, research and outreach activities for the service of God and humanity.

The school
Kabarak University was established in the year 2000 by the 2nd president of Kenya, H.E. the Late Hon. Daniel T. Arap Moi, who was also the founding chancellor. The university was established as a result of his idea of setting up a Christian university that would meet the demand for higher education in Kenya and offer quality education based on strong moral principles. The vice-chancellor is Professor Henry Kiplagat. The university opened its doors to the new students in September 2002. The institution is building a referral hospital that will host the health sciences school and serve as the referral hospital.

Accreditation
The university operated under a letter of interim authority granted by the Kenya government. The letter was presented to the university by the Commission for Higher Education of Kenya, on 16 October 2001, allowing the institution to award degrees. On 16 May 2008 the university was awarded its charter by H.E. Mwai Kibaki.

Location

The Main campus of Kabarak University is located 20 Kilometres (12 mi) from Nakuru City, along the Nakuru – Eldama Ravine road.

University governance
   The Founder.
 Office of the Chancellor.
 The University Governing Council.
 The Board of Trustees.
 The University Management Board (UMB).
 The University Senate.

University management
 Office of the Vice-Chancellor.
 Division of Administration & Finance (AF).
 Division of Academics & Research (AR).
 Office of the Provost
 Office of the Principal (Nakuru City Campus).
 Directorates and Boards.
 Deans of Schools.
 Students Council (KUSO).

Campuses
Kabarak University has Two campuses;
 Main Campus
 Nakuru City Campus

Schools and Institutes

 School of Business & Economics 
 School of Education, Humanities & Social Sciences 
 School of Law 
 School of Medicine & Health Sciences 
 School of Music & Media 
 School of Pharmacy 
 School of Science, Engineering & Technology 
 Institute of Postgraduate Studies

Directorates
 Directorate of Excellence in Learning and Teaching 
 Directorate of Research, Innovation and Outreach 
 Directorate of Quality Assurance & Institutional Advancement 
 Directorate of Kabarak University Online

Academics

All the programs offered by Kabarak University Online are accredited by the Commission for University Education. The university is also fully accredited by the Commission for University Education to offer Fully Online programs.

 Full-Time Programmes 
 Part-Time Programmes
 Fully Online Programmes 
 ICT Short Courses

Student activities

The university has approximately 5000 students drawn from Kenya and the east African region. Students participate in co-curricular activities, for example:
 Aiesec Kabarak
 Kabarak Crisis Intervention and counsellors Association (KACICA)
 Rotaract Club – Kabarak University
 Christian Union
 Students in Free Enterprise (SIFE)
 I Choose Life – ICL
 Foster National Cohesion (FONACON)
 Drama Club
 Kenya Model United Nations – KABARAK CHAPTER (KMUN)
 Kabarak University Journalism Association of Clarisson
 Kenya Red Cross Society KABARAK CHAPTER
 Itech
 Vision 2030 Kabarak chapter

In sports and games, Kabarak students participate in rugby, football, tennis, hockey, badminton, basketball and swimming.

Student Organization
The student government, which is known as Kabarak University Student Organization (KUSO), is the organ that represents student interests.

Notable alumni

See also
 List of universities in Kenya
 Education in Kenya
 Nakuru County
 Commission for University Education

References

External links
Kabarak University website

Private universities and colleges in Kenya
Education in Rift Valley Province
Nakuru
Educational institutions established in 2002
2002 establishments in Kenya